Lophiotoma capricornica is a species of sea snail, a marine gastropod mollusk in the family Turridae, the turrids.

Description
The length of the shell attains 54.3 mm.

Distribution
This marine species occurs off Queensland, Australia

References

 Olivera. 2004. Larger forms in Lophiotoma defined: Four new species described from the Philippines and three from elsewhere in the Indo-Pacific. Science Diliman, 16 (1) : 1-28
 Bouchet, P.; Fontaine, B. (2009). List of new marine species described between 2002-2006. Census of Marine Life.

capricornica
Gastropods described in 2004